The Saraji Coal Mine is a coal mine located near Dysart in the Central Queensland region of Australia. The mine has coal reserves amounting to 648 million tonnes of coking coal, one of the largest coal reserves in Asia and the world. The mine has an annual production capacity of 10 million tonnes of coal.  It is located in the Bowen Basin, an area with significant coal deposits and numerous mines. It is owned by the BHP Mitsubishi Alliance (BMA).

Saraji mine utilises open-cast extraction methods. It has a total of 11 coal seams.  The strikes are on average four km wide and extend for 30 km in a north–south orientation.

Coal is processed via a CHPP (Coal Handling and Processing Plant) consisting of three stages: Coarse - DMCs, Fines - Reflux Classifier, and Ultrafines - Flotation.

Prestripping of 42 million cubic metres of overburden each year is conducted by the HSE Group.

Coal is exported via the Goonyella railway line.

History
Construction work at the site begin in 1972 with the first coal produced in 1974. In 2009, the mine won the People's Choice Award for its feeder blockage removal device at the Queensland Mining Industry Health and Safety Conference.

Miners at Saraji and six other BMA mines went on strike in February 2012 over working conditions.  Work stoppages commenced in 2011.  Meetings between union members and BMA began in December 2010.

See also

Coal in Australia
List of mines in Australia
Construction, Forestry, Mining and Energy Union v BHP Coal Pty Ltd

References 

BHP
Coal mines in Queensland
Mines in Central Queensland
Mitsubishi
1972 establishments in Australia